Anaeromicrobium  is an anaerobic, mesophilic and heterotrophic bacterial genus from the family of Clostridiaceae, with one known species (Anaeromicrobium sediminis). Anaeromicrobium sediminis has been isolated from deep-sea sediments from the West Pacific Ocean.

References

Clostridiaceae
Monotypic bacteria genera
Bacteria genera
Taxa described in 2017